Head On is the second studio album by Canadian rock band Toronto, released in 1981. The album was produced by Terry Brown, best known for his work with Rush.

Track listing

Side 1
"Head On" (Brian Allen) - 4:17
"Silver Screen" (Allen) - 4:04
"Still Talkin' 'bout Love" (Allen) - 4:15
"Someone Will Play the Blues" (Allen) - 3:09
"It Comes from You" (Allen) - 4:02

Side 2
"Enough Is Enough" (Scott Kreyer, Jimmy Fox) - 4:10
"Master of Disguise" (Sheron Alton) - 4:34
"Blackmail" (Kreyer, Holly Woods) - 4:56
"Gone in a Flash" (Kreyer) - 4:43

Personnel

Band members
Holly Woods - lead vocals
Sheron Alton - guitar, backing vocals
Brian Allen - guitar, lead vocals
Scott Kreyer - keyboards, backing vocals
Nick Costello - bass guitar
Jimmy Fox - drums

Production
Terry Brown - producer
Paul Northfield - engineer
Peter Jensen - mastering

Charts

Certifications

References

1981 albums
Toronto (band) albums
Albums produced by Terry Brown (record producer)